Gumbad may refer to:
 Gumbad, East Azerbaijan
 Gumbad, Hamadan